The 2023 FIBA Basketball World Cup qualification for the FIBA Americas region began in April 2021 and concluded in February 2023. The process determined the seven teams that would participate at the 2023 FIBA Basketball World Cup.

Format
The qualification structure was as follows:
Pre-Qualifiers 
First round: teams that did not enter the 2022 FIBA AmeriCup qualifiers were divided into two tournaments, based on geographical sub-zones. The three best placed teams from Central American and the Caribbean zone and the single winner from South American play-off advanced to the second round.
Second round: Four teams advanced from the sub-zone pre-qualifiers were joined by four teams eliminated from 2022 FIBA AmeriCup qualifiers. They were divided into two groups of four teams. The group winners and runners-up advanced to qualifiers.
Qualifiers: The 12 teams that have qualified for the 2022 FIBA AmeriCup were joined by four teams advancing from the pre-qualifiers. 
First round: The 16 teams were divided into four groups of four teams to play home-and-away matches. The three best placed teams from each group advanced to the second round.
Second round: The twelve teams were divided into two groups of six teams. Each group was formed from teams advanced from two first round groups. All results from the previous round were carried over. The three best placed teams from both groups plus fourth placed team with better record qualified for the World Cup.

Entrants

Schedule

Pre-Qualifiers

First round

Central American and Caribbean sub-zone
The tournament was played in single-round robin format in San Salvador. Five teams competed for three spots to the second round.

All times are local (UTC−6).

South American sub-zone
Only two teams contested in the South American pre-qualifiers. They played home-and-away match tie with a winner qualify for the second round of pre-qualifiers.

All times are local.

Second round
Two groups were played as single round-robin tournaments.

Group A
Group A was played in San Salvador from 2 to 4 July 2021.

All times are local (UTC−6).

Group B
Group B was played in Santiago, Chile from 13 to 15 July 2021.

All times are local (UTC−3).

Qualifiers

Qualified teams

Draw
The draw was held on 31 August 2021 in Mies, Switzerland.

Seeding
Seedings were announced on 30 August 2021. Teams were seeded based on geographical principles and FIBA rankings. Teams from pots 1, 3, 5, and 7 were drawn to Groups A and B, while teams from pots 2, 4, 6, and 8 were drawn to Groups C and D.

First round
Due to the COVID-19 pandemic, the November window was played in a single venue. The same was one for the February window for Groups A and C. For the third window, all groups returned to the normal home/away format. 

All times are local.

Group A

Group B

Group C

Group D

Second round
The twelve qualified teams were divided into two groups and played the other three teams from the other group twice. Group A was paired with Group C and Group B with Group D. All results from the first round were carried over.

All times are local.

Group E

Group F

Best fourth placed team

Statistical leaders

Player averages
As of November 14, 2022

Team averages

References

External links
Scores and stats
Tournament summary

FIBA Basketball World Cup qualification
2023 FIBA Basketball World Cup